Henry or Henricus was a Saxon king mentioned in Gesta Danorum. Having just married Finnish princess, Signe in Finland he was slain by king of the Danes, Gram who crashed the wedding. His murder compelled his retainers to join forces with Gram's enemy, Swipdag, who eventually killed him in battle. Later, Swipdag's grandson was named Henry probably after Henry, poetically this Henry was killed by a son of Gram and Signe, Hading.

Text

References

Kings in Norse mythology and legends
Saxon nobility